Wander Luiz Bitencourt Junior or simply Wander Luiz (born May 30, 1987 in Lamim), is a Brazilian professional footballer. Luiz plays mainly as an attacking midfielder and also can be deployed as a forward.

Club career

Vila Nova, Buriram, Ratchaburi, Suphanburi (loan)
Luiz debuted in 2005 with Vila Nova, where he remained there for 5 years before he moved to Thai Division 1 side Buriram (now known as Songkhla United and played for 2 seasons.

In 2012, Luiz later moved to Ratchaburi where he won the title of Thai Division 1 and got the team promoted to Thai Premier League the top tier of Thailand Football League. Luiz was loaned to Suphanburi for the 2012 season.

América, Atletico Huila, Al-Fujairah
He was later confirmed to become part of Colombian club América for 2013 season. At the end of Categoría Primera B first half, Wander helped the team to qualify to the semifinal where he played 21 games and scored 8 goals and being the first Brazilian player to quality to the second phase of the tournament and ended the season with 10 goals after 40 games. He later moved to the Categoría Primera A side (the top tier of Colombian Football League), Atletico Huila in 2014 but did not completed the season as he later moved to UAE Arabian Gulf League side, Al-Fujairah.

Ulsan Hyundai, XV de Piracicaba, Ratchaburi, Tombense
In July 2014, Luiz left Al-Fujairah and signed a contract with K League Classic club Ulsan Hyundai. In 2015, Luiz joined XV de Piracicaba before moved to his former club Ratchaburi which playing in the top-tier of Thai Football League, Thailand Premier League. In March 2016, he joined Tombense.

Kelantan
On 18 June 2016, Luiz signed a contract with Malaysia Super League side Kelantan. On 12 July 2016, Luiz made his debut for Kelantan during Malaysia Cup group stage in a 1–0 win over Pahang at their home Sultan Muhammad IV Stadium. His league debut came on 15 July 2016 which resulted in massive 6–1 win over Terengganu at away team ground with him putting on an excellent performance by scoring 1 goal which is the second goal of the match and provided an assist for Baže Ilijoski for the sixth goal.

Al-Raed
After his contract with Kelantan expired, Luiz signed a contract with Saudi club Al-Raed. On 1 February 2017, Luiz made Saudi Professional League in a 1–3 defeat to Al-Fateh coming off from the bench at second half of the match. His first league goal came in 1–1 draw over Al-Faisaly on 17 February 2017.

Perak
On 10 January 2018, it was announced that Luiz signed a contract with Malaysia Super League club Perak. Luiz were given jersey number 10.

Career statistics

Club

1 Includes Copa Colombia, Malaysia FA Cup and King Cup matches.
2 Includes Malaysia Cup and Crown Prince Cup matches.

Honours

Club
Perak TBG F.C.
 Malaysia Cup Winner (1): 2018

References

External links
 
 

1987 births
Living people
Brazilian footballers
Brazilian expatriate footballers
Wander Luiz
Categoría Primera A players
Categoría Primera B players
K League 1 players
Vila Nova Futebol Clube players
Wander Luiz
Wander Luiz
Wander Luiz
América de Cali footballers
Atlético Huila footballers
Ulsan Hyundai FC players
Perak F.C. players
Kelantan FA players
Fujairah FC players
Al-Raed FC players
Mesaimeer SC players
Expatriate footballers in Thailand
Brazilian expatriate sportspeople in Thailand
Expatriate footballers in Colombia
Brazilian expatriate sportspeople in Colombia
Brazilian expatriate sportspeople in South Korea
Expatriate footballers in South Korea
Expatriate footballers in Malaysia
Brazilian expatriate sportspeople in Malaysia
Expatriate footballers in the United Arab Emirates
Brazilian expatriate sportspeople in the United Arab Emirates
Expatriate footballers in Saudi Arabia
Brazilian expatriate sportspeople in Saudi Arabia
Expatriate footballers in Qatar
Brazilian expatriate sportspeople in Qatar
Association football midfielders
UAE First Division League players
Saudi Professional League players
Qatari Second Division players